A pay toilet is a public toilet that requires the user to pay. It may be street furniture or be inside a building, e.g. a shopping mall, department store, or railway station. The reason for charging money is usually for the maintenance of the equipment. Paying to use a toilet can be traced back almost 2000 years, to the first century BCE. The charge is often collected by an attendant or by inserting coins into an automatic turnstile; in some freestanding toilets in the street, the fee is inserted into a slot by the door. Mechanical coin operated locks are also used. Some more high tech toilets accept card or contactless payments. Sometimes, a token can be used to enter a pay toilet without paying the charge. Some municipalities offer these tokens to residents with disabilities so these groups aren't discriminated against by the pay toilet. Some establishments such as cafés and restaurants offer tokens to their customers so they can use the toilets for free but other users must pay the relevant charge.

Examples

Europe 
Pay toilets are especially common in Continental Europe. The Paris Métro operates coin-operated toilets in its underground stations; and even non-mechanized toilets occasionally have attendants who accept tips. 

In Germany, many lavatories at service stations on the Autobahn have pay toilets with turnstiles, though as in France, customers typically receive a voucher equal to the toilet fee.  Elsewhere, while public toilets may not have a set fee, it is customary to provide change to restroom attendants for their services. Some service stations offer a voucher equal in value to the amount paid for use of a toilet, redeemable for other goods at that station or others in the same chain. 

In Eastern Europe, particularly in  the former USSR, pay toilets are usually non-automatic and are like usual public toilets except that they have an attendant at the entrance to collect the money from visitors.

In the United Kingdom, pay toilets tend to be common at bus and railway stations, but most public toilets are free to use. Technically, any toilets provided by local government may be subject to a charge by the provider. Pay toilets on the streets may provide men's urinals free of charge to prevent public urination. For example, in London, a few public conveniences are appearing in the form of pop-up toilets. During the daytime, these toilets are hidden beneath the streets, and only appear in the evening. The British English euphemism "to spend a penny" for "to urinate" derives from the use of a pre-decimal penny coin for pay toilet locks.

Latin and South America 
In Argentina, pay toilets are not common. Toilets placed in public places are typically free to use but the attendant is seated outside with a dish by his side expecting a tip from the user, often with a sign saying "Su propina es nuestro sueldo" (your tip is our salary). It is customary to give a coin or a $2 bill, especially if the toilets requiring paper are used.

In Mexico, the majority of pay toilets have turnstiles and an attendant at the entrance.  The attendant gives out toilet paper and sometimes a paper towel.

Asia 
In India, Sulabh International is the major operator of pay toilets (sulabh shauchalaya). These are provided with an attendant, and the fee is 2 rupees. They provide toilet as well as bathroom facilities. They are situated in public places like bus stations and major markets, but several sulabh shauchalayas also act as community toilets in areas with poor sanitation facilities.

In Singapore, pay toilets are still common in "Hawker Centers"; the use of the toilet usually costs 10-20 cents. The fee is usually paid to an attendant behind a counter; however, certain hawker centres have a turnstile into which the coin is inserted. Sometimes toilet paper is also charged for, and given out at the entrance usually by the attendant, though most of the time there is a toilet paper holder in the cubicle (stall) itself.

In some areas of Taiwan, mostly in subways, one must pay for the toilet paper, but the toilet itself is free.

In Turkey pay toilets are common at bus stations and underground cities (but not single-building shopping malls), where a charge of between 50 kuruş and 1 lira is levied at a turnstile for entrance to the bathroom.

U.S. 

In the United States, pay toilets became much less common from the 1970s, when they came under attack from feminists as well as from the plumbing industry. California legislator March Fong Eu argued that they discriminated against females because men and boys could use urinals for free whereas women and girls always had to pay a dime for a toilet "stall" (i.e. cubicle) in places where payment was mandatory. The American Restroom Association was a proponent of an amendment to the National Model Building Code to allow pay toilets only where there were also free toilets. A campaign by the Committee to End Pay Toilets in America (CEPTIA) resulted in laws prohibiting pay toilets in some cities and states. In 1973, Chicago became the first American city to enact a ban, at a time when, according to The Wall Street Journal, there were at least 50,000 units in America, mostly made by the Nik-O-Lok Company. CEPTIA was successful over the next few years in obtaining bans in New York, New Jersey, Minnesota, California, Florida and Ohio. Lobbying was successful in other states as well, and by the end of the decade, pay toilets were greatly reduced in America. However, they are still in use and produced by the Nik-O-Lok company; many of these laws have since been repealed, such as in Ohio. In 2007, legislators rescinded ORC Ordinance 4101:1-29-02.6.2, the ban on pay facilities, paving the way for operators to charge for public restroom use.

Africa 

In Africa, pay toilets are particularly common in informal settlements lacking sewage systems. Of all countries, Ghana has the greatest reliance on public toilets. In Accra, lack of space makes private toilets unrealistic in low-income neighbourhoods. In Kumasi, it has been estimated that 36% of residents use pay toilets, and that "once-daily use of a public toilet by a family of four would cost between US$3.60 and $18 per month depending on the fee charged by the operator of the toilet they use."

History
Some of the earliest documented pay toilets were built around 74 AD in Rome. Emperor Titus Flavius Vespasianus created this method to ease the financial hardships resulting from the many wars that had been fought. This was not a popular choice with his people, and he was ridiculed for the decision, to which he reacted with the famous quote, Pecunia non olet, "Money does not stink".

The Greco-Roman city of Ephesus was important in ancient times, becoming the trade centre and commercial hub of the ancient world. The Scholastica Baths were built in the 1st century AD, and contained all of the modern amenities for hygiene, including advanced public toilets with marble seats. One had to pay to enter these luxury conveniences, where one could enjoy the use of a pool, use the toilet or socialize.

John Nevil Maskelyne, an English stage magician, invented the first modern pay toilet in the late 19th century. His door lock for London toilets required the insertion of a penny coin to operate it, hence the euphemism to "spend a penny".

The first pay toilet in the United States was installed in 1910 in Terre Haute, Indiana.

Cultural references
Whether or not public toilets should require payment is a plot point in Noël Coward's 1949 play South Sea Bubble.

Pay toilets are key to the 2001 American musical Urinetown.

In the 1977 movie Smokey and the Bandit Frog says "I have to go 10-100, could I have a dime? To which he replies, "crawl under"

Criticism 
People in development countries or low incomes, for instance in Accra, may choose to defecate in the open rather than pay to use toilets. Or they may limit the number of times per day that they use a pay toilet. Thus pay toilets have possibly undesirable public health consequences.

See also 
Committee to End Pay Toilets in America
 Outhouse
 Portable toilet
 Sanisette
 Urinal

References 

Toilets
Vending